The 1918–19 Navy Midshipmen men's basketball team represented the United States Naval Academy in intercollegiate basketball during the 1918–19 season. The team finished the season with a 16–0 record and was retroactively named the 1918–19 national champion by the Premo-Porretta Power Poll. It was head coach Billy Lush's third season overall as head basketball coach at Navy, and his first season since returning to the position eight years after his initial stint as head coach.

References

Navy Midshipmen men's basketball seasons
Navy
NCAA Division I men's basketball tournament championship seasons
Navy Midshipmen Men's Basketball Team
Navy Midshipmen Men's Basketball Team